The Fourth Commandment of the Ten Commandments may refer to:
 "Remember the sabbath day, to keep it holy", under the Philonic division used by Hellenistic Jews, Greek Orthodox and Protestants except Lutherans, or the Talmudic division of the third-century Jewish Talmud
 "Honour thy father and thy mother", under the Augustinian division used by Roman Catholics and Lutherans

Films
 The Fourth Commandment (1927 film), an American silent drama film
 The Fourth Commandment (1950 film), an Austrian historical drama film